Becky Sharp is a 1935 American Technicolor historical drama film directed by Rouben Mamoulian and starring Miriam Hopkins who was nominated for the Best Actress Oscar. Other supporting cast were William Faversham, Frances Dee, Cedric Hardwicke, Billie Burke, Alison Skipworth, Nigel Bruce, and Alan Mowbray.

The film is based on the 1899 play of the same name by Langdon Mitchell, which in turn was based on William Makepeace Thackeray's 1848 novel Vanity Fair. The play was made famous in the late 1890s by actress Minnie Maddern Fiske. The screenplay was written by Francis Edward Faragoh. The film was considered a landmark in cinema as the first feature film to use the newly developed three-strip Technicolor production throughout, opening the way for a growing number of color films to be made in Britain and the United States in the years leading up to World War II. In 2019, the film was selected by the Library of Congress for preservation in the United States National Film Registry for being "culturally, historically, or aesthetically significant".

The film recounts the tale of a lower-class girl who insinuates herself into an upper-class family, only to see her life and the lives of those around her destroyed.

Plot
Becky Sharp (Miriam Hopkins), a socially ambitious young lady, manages to survive during the background years of Napoleon's defeat at Waterloo.  Becky gradually climbs the British social ladder, overcoming poverty and class distinctions, through her best friend Amelia Sedley (Frances Dee), praising any rich man who would listen.

In her efforts to advance herself, she manages to connect with a number of gentlemen: the Marquis of Steyne (Cedric Hardwicke), Joseph Sedley (Nigel Bruce), Rawdon Crawley (Alan Mowbray), and George Osborne (G. P. Huntley Jr), the husband of Amelia.

She rises to the top of British society but becomes the scourge of the social circle, offending influential ladies such as Lady Bareacres (Billie Burke).

Sharp falls into the humiliation of singing for her meals in a beer hall, but she never stays down for long. At the end, she cons her last man and finally lands Amelia's brother, Joseph.

Cast

 Miriam Hopkins as Becky Sharp
 Frances Dee as Amelia Sedley
 Cedric Hardwicke as Marquis of Steyne
 Billie Burke as Lady Bareacres
 Alison Skipworth as Miss Crawley
 Nigel Bruce as Joseph Sedley
 Alan Mowbray as Rawdon Crawley
 G. P. Huntley Jr. as George Osborne
 William Stack as Pitt Crawley
 George Hassell as Sir Pitt Crawley
 William Faversham as Duke of Wellington
 Charles Richman as General Tufto
 Doris Lloyd as Duchess of Richmond
 Colin Tapley as William Dobbin
 Leonard Mudie as Tarquin
 May Beatty as Briggs
 Charles Coleman as Bowles
 Bunny Beatty as Lady Blanche
 Finis Barton as Miss Flowery
 Olaf Hytten as The Prince Regent
 Pauline Garon as Fifine
 James 'Hambone' Robinson as Sedley's page
 Elspeth Dudgeon as Miss Pinkerton
 Tempe Pigott as The Charwoman
 Ottola Nesmith as Lady Jane Crawley
 Creighton Hale as British Officer (uncredited)

Production

John Hay "Jock" Whitney and Cornelius Vanderbilt Whitney formed Pioneer Pictures specifically to produce color films, and signed a contract to release Pioneer films through RKO Radio Pictures.

After producing La Cucaracha, Becky Sharp, and Dancing Pirate (1936), the Whitneys and David O. Selznick formed Selznick International Pictures. Two Selznick International films, A Star Is Born and Nothing Sacred (both 1937), were produced by Selznick, copyrighted by Pioneer Pictures, and released through United Artists rather than RKO. The film went public domain in 1963 after the copyright lapsed and was not renewed.

Lowell Sherman, the original director, had fallen ill while working on Night Life of the Gods before starting Becky Sharp, but had continued to work on the project; he died of double pneumonia four weeks into production.

Future First Lady Pat Nixon, who was a sometimes movie extra while attending college at USC, had a single spoken line in the film, but it did not make the final edit.

After Sherman's death, Rouben Mamoulian was brought in to finish the film. Mamoulian did not use any of the footage shot by Sherman, deciding instead to reshoot the entire film.

Color development
Becky Sharp was the first feature film to use the three-strip Technicolor process, which created a separate film register for each of the three primary colors, for the entirety of the film.

Earlier live action films to use the new Technicolor process for part of the film include the final musical number in the feature The Cat and the Fiddle released by MGM in February 1934, and in short sequences filmed for other movies made during 1934, including The House of Rothschild (Twentieth Century Pictures/United Artists) with George Arliss and Kid Millions (Samuel Goldwyn/United Artists) with Eddie Cantor. Warner Brothers released two Leon Errol shorts, Service with a Smile (July 28, 1934) and Good Morning, Eve! (September 22, 1934), and RKO Pictures released the short La Cucaracha (August 31, 1934).

Reception
Writing for The Spectator, Graham Greene raved that "colour is everything here" and characterizing its use in the film as "a triumph". Although Greene complained that the Technicolor "plays havoc with the women's faces", leveled criticism at Hopkins for her "indecisive acting", and noted that he had found the film's climax in Bath to be "absurd" and "silly", he described these minor complaints as "ungrateful" and his overall impression was that the film gave "delight to the eye".

Awards and honors
Wins
 Venice Film Festival: Best Color Film, Rouben Mamoulian, 1935

Nominations
 Academy Awards: Best Actress in a Leading Role, Miriam Hopkins, 1935
 Venice Film Festival: Mussolini Cup, Rouben Mamoulian, 1935

Preservation status
For many years, the original three-color Technicolor version of the film was not available for viewing, though a 16 millimeter version was available. This version had been printed (poorly) on two-color Cinecolor stock which did not accurately reproduce the colors of the original film. The smaller film gauge also resulted in a grainier, inferior image.

In the 1980s, the UCLA Film and Television Archive restored the film, under the supervision of archivist Robert Gitt. Rouben Mamoulian appeared at the premiere of the restored print at the Academy of Motion Picture Arts and Sciences theatre in Beverly Hills.

See also
 List of films in the public domain in the United States

References

External links

 
 
 
 
 Becky Sharp at Film Reference web site.
 
 Becky Sharp on Theatre Royal: July 21, 1954
 

1935 films
1930s color films
Cultural depictions of George IV
American historical drama films
1930s historical drama films
American films based on plays
Films directed by Rouben Mamoulian
RKO Pictures films
Films set in Belgium
Films set in London
Belgium in fiction
Films set in England
Films set in the 1810s
England in fiction
Films based on Vanity Fair (novel)
Films based on adaptations
United States National Film Registry films
1935 drama films
Early color films
Films about social class
Articles containing video clips
1930s English-language films
1930s American films
Films with screenplays by Francis Edward Faragoh